Lach is an American singer-songwriter associated with the anti-folk movement. As a songwriter, Lach founded the anti-folk art and music movement, which is cited as a main inspiration by contemporary performers like Beck, Jeffrey Lewis, Hamell on Trial, The Moldy Peaches and Regina Spektor in the US and Laura Marling in the UK. Lach has released six albums, a book of poetry, and has a regular series on BBC Radio 4 called The Lach Chronicles.

Early life
Lach was born in Brooklyn, New York and raised in suburban Rockland County. He learned to play classical piano at a young age, but turned to rock music after discovering punk bands like the Sex Pistols, the Clash, the Damned, and the Jam. Lach went to college but quickly dropped out to live in Las Vegas, resuming his education at Boston University, where he met his later bassist Geoffrey Notkin.

Career
Lach moved to Greenwich Village in New York City in 1983, looking to play the renowned Folk City club. Having been rejected by the club's bookers, who believed his music was too "punk", he moved to the Lower East Side, opening his own illegal after-hours club, the Fort. The opening of the Fort coincided with the New York City Folk Festival, so Lach held an event at his club called the New York Antifolk Festival, which remains a popular event in the East Village.

In 1990, Lach put out his debut CD, Contender on the Goldcastle label. The album received rave reviews in the press and considerable radio play, but the record label folded three months later. Lach moved to San Francisco releasing an EP, Family Values Pack, containing "The Hillary Clinton Song" which aired on over 600 stations during Bill Clinton's first campaign.

In 1993, Lach returned to New York City and started The Fort up again at The Sidewalk Cafe in the East Village, ushering in a new wave of anti-folk. In 1997 Lach started his own label, Fortified Records, and released, in conjunction with Shanachie Records, Lach's Antihoot: Live from the Fort. Fortified subsequently released downtown comedian Rick Shapiro's Unconditional Love, produced by Lach (1998) and Major Matt Mason USA's Me, Me, Me (2000). In 1999 Fortified released Lach's second album Blang!, produced by Richard Barone.

September 18, 2001 saw the domestic release of Kids Fly Free, again produced by Richard Barone with a 16-page lyric booklet illustrated by Daniel Johnston. Tours of the UK by Lach and other NYC anti-folkers such as The Moldy Peaches, Hamell On Trial and Jeffrey Lewis sparked the beginnings of the UK scene, inspiring such British artists as Milk Kan, Filthy Pedro, David Cronberg's Wife, Sgt. Joe Buzzfuzz and Laura Marling. The 12 Bar Club began hosting monthly anti-folk nights called Blang!

In 2002 Lach signed with the Agency Group as his exclusive European booking agent, and with Steve Hawkins as his tour manager. Track Records released Kids Fly Free in the UK on May 7. Lach was also featured on Antifolk Vol.1 (Rough Trade), compiled by The Moldy Peaches.

In 2004, Sanctuary Press released Waking Up in New York City: A Musical Tour of The Big Apple by Mike Evans, with a chapter devoted to Lach. Lach's band 'Lach and The Secrets', featuring Billy Ficca on drums and Roy Edroso on bass, arrived in the UK In March that year for eight shows in eight nights including a show at The Basement Club organized by Strokes producer Gordon Raphael. Lach and The Secrets released their album, Today. Lach toured UK and France as a solo artist, performing 35 dates supporting Suzanne Vega, Television and The Fine Young Cannibals.

In 2005, he toured the UK including five dates sharing the bill with The Casbah Club. In 2006, Lach organized the biggest 'Fortified Summer Antifolk Fest' yet with a concert in Tompkins Square Park, an anti-folk parade and special guest set from Suzanne Vega. Lach toured the UK including an Anti-folk Fest at The Barfly in London featuring Lach headlining a show with nine other UK anti-folk acts.

In 2007, Lach signed with Primary UK Booking Agency. Lach finished his fifth album The Calm Before recording once again with Billy Ficca, Richard Barone, Mike Visceglia, Chris Barron and Lydia Ooghe at Studio G in Brooklyn.

In 2008, Lach said goodbye to Sidewalk Café and his weekly Antihoot, New York's longest running open mic ("A Manhattan Institution"). A subsequent documentary on Lach's farewell was filmed YouTube. The Calm Before was released on Fortified Records and Lach toured the US for the first time as well as the UK and the Netherlands. The album hit the College Charts, becoming Fortified's best seller. In 2009, he toured the UK with Neil Halstead.  In 2010, Lach completed a new album, Ramshackle Heart which was recorded in the UK with Halstead. Lach took on running two nights a week (the 'Tuesday Antihoot' and Wednesday's 'Lach Presents' series) at the Webster Hall in New York. Lach subsequently took on the role of executive producer of the venue.

After debuting his one-man show 'The Day I Went Insane' in the UK, Lach was discovered by BBC producer Richard Melvin and comedy producer Karen Koren. He was then invited to headline The Edinburgh Fringe Festival's venue, The Gilded Balloon.

Lach moved to Edinburgh, a move documented on BBC Radio Scotland in a special entitled From New York to New Town. Lach continued to do The Edinburgh Fringe in 2011 and 2012. Lach also toured the UK extensively including shows with Hamell on Trial, Michelle Shocked, Dean Friedman, The Spin Doctors and Florence and The Machine. Lach wrote a book, The Day I Went Insane which was then commissioned by BBC Radio 4 for a full series produced by Dabster Productions.

In 2013, he became executive producer of Edinburgh's Henry's Cellar Bar revamping the look and style of the venue and programming performances from such stars as Thomas Truax and Toby Goodshank. At the venue, he started the Mondays Antihoot Open Stage, Tuesdays Songwriter's Cellar and Wednesday's Antihoot Radio Night. Antihoot Radio Night featured a weekly radio sit-com written by Lach and featuring some of the top comics in Scotland. His 2013 Edinburgh Fringe show Anticdotes was produced in conjunction with transgressive comedian Bob Slayer's Heroes of The Fringe.

In August 2013, BBC Radio 4 premiered The Lach Chronicles written and performed by Lach and produced by Edinburgh's Dabster Productions. A weekly four-part series featuring Lach's songs, stories and comedy. In 2014, he left Henry's Cellar Bar and Dive took up residency at Summerhall in Edinburgh. The BBC commissioned a second series of The Lach Chronicles and it was broadcast in December 2014. Desert Hearts publishing commissioned a book of poetry from Lach entitled The Thin Book of Poems for a January 19, 2015 release.

In 2015, Lach toured the UK with Chris Barron. Desert Hearts Publishing released Lach's The Thin Book of Poems and Lach toured the UK reading selections from the book in bookstores during the day and playing the local music venues at night. In 2016, BBC Radio 4 commissioned a third series of The Lach Chronicles aired in June. Lach was named creative director of The New Wee Theatre which presented performances at The New Town Theatre as part of The Edinburgh Fringe Festival in 2016.

Discography
Contender (1991) – 3/5 on AllMusic
Blang! (1999)
Kids Fly Free (2001)
Today (2004) – "a gem of an album"
The Calm Before (2008) – 3/5 on AllMusic
Ramshackle Heart (2011) – 3/5 in The List

References

Anti-folk musicians
Living people
Singers from New York City
Year of birth missing (living people)
Musicians from Brooklyn
American male singer-songwriters
Singer-songwriters from New York (state)